Andrei Vladimirovich Lezin (born 28 July 1981) is a Russian former competitive figure skater. He is the 2004 Karl Schäfer Memorial champion, 1999 ISU Junior Grand Prix in Norway bronze medalist, and 2005 Russian national bronze medalist.

Lezin finished 20th at the 2000 World Junior Championships in Oberstdorf and 14th at the 2005 European Championships in Turin. After the death of his coach, Igor Rusakov, he joined Elena Tchaikovskaia and Vladimir Kotin.

Lezin's wife, Natalia, is a former skater who became a national-level judge.

Programs

Competitive highlights
GP: Grand Prix; JGP: Junior Grand Prix

References

External links 
 
 Andrei Lezin at Tracings

Russian male single skaters
1981 births
Figure skaters from Moscow
Living people
Competitors at the 2003 Winter Universiade